Mila from Mars (Мила от Марс) is a 2004 Bulgarian film directed by Zornitsa Sophia. It was Bulgaria's submission to the 77th Academy Awards for the Academy Award for Best Foreign Language Film, but was not accepted as a nominee.

See also

Cinema of Bulgaria
List of submissions to the 77th Academy Awards for Best Foreign Language Film

References

External links

2004 films
Bulgarian drama films